Charles "Spider" Jones (born April 20, 1946) is a Canadian journalist, author, and former amateur boxer. He is a former three-time Golden Glove Champion and was inducted into the Canadian Boxing Hall of Fame in 1996. Jones was once voted "Boxing Commentator and M.C. of the Year" by the Board of Governors of the World Boxing Federation.

Born and raised in Windsor, Ontario, Jones spent much of his early teen years living across the border in Detroit.

Jones formerly hosted a talk radio show on CFRB 1010 in Toronto.

Books

Out of the Darkness: The Spider Jones Story. ECW Press (November 2003).

References

External links

The Spider Jones Show – CFRB

1946 births
Black Canadian boxers
Black Canadian broadcasters
Canadian non-fiction writers
Canadian sports talk radio hosts
Canadian talk radio hosts
Living people
Canadian male boxers
Members of the Order of Ontario
Seneca College alumni
Boxers from Detroit
Sportspeople from Windsor, Ontario
Writers from Detroit
Writers from Windsor, Ontario